Education and Science Workers' Union may refer to:

 Education and Science Workers' Union (Germany)
 Education and Science Workers' Union (Turkey)